Blue Moon is a novel by British writer Lee Child. This is the twenty-fourth book in the Jack Reacher series, and the last to be written by Lee Child alone. Delacorte Publisher initially released the book on 29 October 2019.

Plot summary
Jack Reacher gets off a bus in an unnamed city east of the Mississippi after spotting a mugger trying to rob an elderly man. He foils the mugging, and the man introduces himself as Aaron Shevick. He reveals that the large bundle of cash he's carrying is intended for a loan shark named Fisnik who is associated with the local Albanian mafia, headed up by a mobster named Dino. Unbeknownst to both Reacher and Shevick, Fisnik is already dead, having been murdered on Dino's orders after Gregory, the boss of the rival Ukrainian mafia, framed him and another Albanian gangster as police informants.

Arriving at a local bar, Reacher (posing as Shevick) meets the Ukrainians who have taken over Fisnik's operation, killing two of them in the process by staging a car accident. At Shevick's home, Reacher questions him and his wife Maria about their circumstances after noticing that the couple has sold nearly everything they own of value. The couple explain that their adult daughter, Meg, is suffering from late-stage cancer, but cannot afford treatment due to her former boss, Maxim Trulenko, having embezzled millions from his own company before it collapsed, leaving her without health insurance. The Shevicks were subsequently forced to sign an agreement with the hospital to pay for her treatment in advance, and even with multiple pro bono lawyers working on their case, they have no other option but to take out loans from the mob.

Dino orders two of Gregory's men gunned down in retaliation for deceiving him. Gregory, having just learned about the deaths of his other two men, believes that the Albanians are preparing for war and has two Albanian bagmen killed and put on display outside Dino's office. Meanwhile, Reacher begins to search for Trulenko, who he suspects is still hiding in the city. His investigation is noticed by the Ukrainians, and Reacher manages to hide from them with the help of Abigail "Abby" Gibson, a waitress employed at a small watering hole that pays protection to Gregory. They go to bring food to Shevick, only to learn that his wife is missing. Dino has the Ukrainian owners of a massage parlor abducted and killed, but Gregory forgoes further retaliation after learning about Reacher, ordering him to be found.

Reacher, Abigail, and Shevick find Maria at a pawn shop, and bring her home just as Gregory's men show up. Abby and Shevick trick them into leaving, and Reacher captures two of Gregory's men for questioning, only to kill them when they resist. Needing a new place to hide, Abby takes Reacher to stay with her friends, musicians Frank and Joe, and when Reacher manages to steal phones from both a Ukrainian and an Albanian soldier, Joe enlists a retired Cold War field officer, Guy Vantrescu, to help them translate the various text messages on the phones. The group eventually deduces that Trulenko is working with the Ukrainians to run a fake news content farm for the Russian government within the borders of the United States, ensuring that it cannot be blocked by American authorities.

The Albanians finally locate Reacher after he accidentally leaves one of their stolen cars unsecured while delivering food to Shevick; he and Abby are brought to Dino's office just as an argument breaks out between Dino and his underboss Jetmir, who Dino accuses of plotting against him. Jetmir shoots his boss dead and is subsequently killed by another Albanian; the mobsters start firing on each other and Reacher uses the chaos to free himself and kill all of the remaining Albanians before setting fire to their headquarters. Gregory, fearing that he'll be next, tries to kidnap Maria but fails; an enraged Reacher then locates his office, guns down his men, and kills Gregory by dropping a heavy bookcase on him, breaking his neck.

Vantrescu is able to pinpoint the exact location of Trulenko's farm - the middle floors of a large office building downtown. Reacher, Abby, Frank, Joe, and Vantrescu pose as maintenance workers and access the building, slowly working their way through all of the security measures and killing several guards until they finally locate Trulenko. Reacher forces him at gunpoint to transfer all of his money, as well as Gregory's, into Shevick's personal account before shooting him dead and tipping off a Washington Post reporter about the farm's existence to ensure that it will be shut down and hide everyone's involvement.

With the Shevicks now able to pay for Meg's care and rebuild their lives, Reacher spends one final night with Abby before they go their separate ways. Reacher makes his way to the depot and quietly boards a bus heading west, resuming his original journey.

Reception

Publishers Weekly called it "riveting" and a "nail-biter".

Kirkus Reviews stated that the novel had "the best premise for a Reacher novel in some time" — and emphasized that this was an indicator that "something has gone off in the series", criticizing the exposition and Child's techniques for depicting violence.

The Hindustan Times found it to be not Child's best work, but nonetheless "engaging and diverting", and noted that its "sense of sameness" (compared to the other books in the series) was "comforting".

In the Evening Standard, Mark Sanderson called it "morality pornography", with the action sequences being "operatic, almost comedic"; in particular, Sanderson faulted Abby the waitress for having "all the personality of a sexbot".

References

External links

English novels
Jack Reacher books
2019 British novels
Delacorte Press books